Vallonia parvula or trumpet vallonia is a species of small, air-breathing land snail, a terrestrial pulmonate gastropod mollusk in the family Valloniidae.

See also
List of threatened fauna of Michigan

References

External links
Global Names Index entry
EOL entry
shell detail
ADW entry
ZipcodeZoo entry
Vallonidae species

Valloniidae
Gastropods described in 1893